The Marquis Opera House is a historic building in Scottsbluff, Nebraska. It was first built by L. C. Marquis and C. R. Inman in 1909–10 as a theatre, with an auditorium inside. It closed down, and the building redesigned in the Classical Revival style in 1916. The auditorium was remodelled into floors for apartments and offices. The building has been listed on the National Register of Historic Places since October 10, 1985.

References

National Register of Historic Places in Scotts Bluff County, Nebraska
Neoclassical architecture in Nebraska
Buildings and structures completed in 1909